The following is a list of notable events and releases of the year 1887 in Norwegian music.

Events

Deaths

 March
 11 – Ludvig Mathias Lindeman, composer and organist (born 1812).

 May
 7 – Alette Due, pianist and composer (born 1812).

Births

 April
 3 – Edvard Bræin, organist, composer, and orchestra conductor (died 1957).

 August
 25 – Fartein Valen, composer (died 1952).

See also
 1887 in Norway
 Music of Norway

References

 
Norwegian music
Norwegian
Music
1880s in Norwegian music